Betty Herbertson is a former Australian international lawn bowler.

Bowls career
Herbertson has represented Australia at the Commonwealth Games, in the fours at the 1994 Commonwealth Games in Victoria, Canada.

She won the triples gold medal (with Dorothy Roche and Audrey Rutherford) at the 1993 Asia Pacific Bowls Championships, also in Victoria.

References

Australian female bowls players
Living people
Bowls players at the 1994 Commonwealth Games
Year of birth missing (living people)